The New English School Inamgaon came into existence in 1961. Baburaoji Gholap founded the Pune District Education Association  to have schools set up in remote areas of Pune, pertaining to secondary education. The perpetual work led the expansions of Pune District Education Association  into Inamgaon, to have education easily accessible.

History
Pune District Education Association, Pune laid its founding stone of New English School Inamgaon in 1971. Its aim was to uplift literacy in socioeconomically weaker sections, farmers in the village. The establishment started with one small social gathering hall, eventually it expanded to its very own extravagant building with all amenities and a quality staff.

Mission
The PDEA institute wants the literacy to go farther to every class of society. It would ensure easily accessible establishments for remote areas with world class education.

References

Education in Maharashtra
Schools in Pune district
Schools in Pune